Yangikurgan can mean one of the following localities:

 Yangiqoʻrgʻon, an urban-type settlement in Namangan Region, Uzbekistan
 Yangiqoʻrgʻon District, Namangan Region, Uzbekistan
 Ibrat, formerly Yangiqoʻrgʻon, a village in Fergana Region, Uzbekistan
 Yangiqurghon, Tajikistan, a town in Tajikistan